Flitton (Flichtam, Fllite, Flute) is a village and former civil parish, now in the parish of Flitton and Greenfield, in the Central Bedfordshire district, in the ceremonial county of Bedfordshire, England. The village derives its name from the River Flit which flows close by it. It is notable primarily as the home of the De Grey Mausoleum adjacent to the St John the Baptist Church. Richard Milward, the editor of Selden's Table Talk, was born at Flitton in 1609. There are two pubs, The White Hart by the church hall and Jolly Coopers at Wardhedges. The annual ‘Gala’ and ‘Potato Race’ are two of the main events that happen in the village. In 1961 the parish had a population of 572. On 1 April 1985 the parish was abolished to form "Flitton & Greenfield", parts also went to Flitwick, Pulloxhill and Westoning.

The village was struck by an F1/T2 tornado on 23 November 1981, a part of the record-breaking nationwide tornado outbreak on that day.

MK Dons leading goalscorer Izale McLeod lived on Flitton Hill during his second spell with the club in 2013–14.

Church of St John the Baptist 
The church, which stands on a slight mound on the west side of the village, was probably built by Edmund Grey, Earl of Kent (1465), between 1440 and 1489. On the walls of the north aisle are three fragmentary brasses commemorating: Eleanor Conquest (1434), Elizabeth, wife of Thomas Waren (1544) and Alice, wife of Reginald Hill (1594).

There are six bells, (five dated 1902 and one 1904) by Bowell of Ipswich; they replaced five of 1687 by Richard Chandler of Drayton Parslow.

The natural philosopher and meteorologist George Hadley (1685–1768) is buried in the chancel.

See also 
De Grey Mausoleum
Wrest Park

References

Bibliography
Page, William, editor: The Victoria History of the Counties of England: Bedfordshire, University of London, Dawsons, London 1972, pp 325–332
Pevsner, Nikolaus: The Buildings of England: Bedfordshire, Huntingdon and Peterborough, Penguin Books, London 1968, 

Villages in Bedfordshire
Former civil parishes in Bedfordshire
Central Bedfordshire District